Francis Kwadwo Gyefour (Born 17 March 1945 is a Ghanaian politician. He is a Social Worker and a Businessman, he served for Krachi constituency as a member of parliament in the Volta Region of Ghana.

Early life and education 
Francis Kwadwo Gyefour was born on March 17, 1945. He attended Uni-Bremen (University of Bremen) where he obtained a Bachelor of Science in Economics and a Master of Science in Social Science.

Career 
Francis Kwadwo Gyefour is a former member of the first parliament of the fourth republic from January 1993 to January 1997. He is a Social worker and a Businessman.

Politics 
Gyefour was first elected during the 1992 Ghanaian parliamentary election on the ticket of the National Democratic Congress as a member of the first parliament of the fourth republic. Sampson Kwadwo Apraku took the seat from him in the 1996 Ghanaian general election with 31,055 votes which represented 44.10% of the share by defeating Jilimah Patrick Charity of the Convention People's Party (CPP) who obtained 7,922 votes which represented 11.20% of the share; Francis Gyefour an Independen who obtained 7,896 votes which represented 11.20% of the share; Isaac K.Bruce-Mensah Phoyon an Independent who obtained 1,513 votes which represented 2.10% of the share and John Ajet-Nasam of the New Patriotic Party (NPP) who obtained no votes.

Personal life 
He is a Christian.

References

1945 births
Ghanaian MPs 1993–1997
National Democratic Congress (Ghana) politicians
University of Bremen alumni
People from Volta Region
Ghanaian Christians
Social workers
Ghanaian businesspeople
Living people